The subglacial Esjufjöll volcano is located at the SE part of the Vatnajökull icecap. Esjufjöll is a strict nature reserve (IUCN category Ia).

Geography
The mountains, actually nunataks within Vatnajökull, are located to the north of Öræfajökull volcano and of Jökulsárlón glacial lake. The mountain range consists of 4 mountain massifs with three valleys in between them.

The glaciers flowing around them are feeding Breiðamerkurjökull and in the end Jökulsárlón.

Volcanism
Esjufjöll are a small volcanic system and as such part of Iceland's Oræfi Volcanic Belt. Also part of this zone are Öræfajökull and Snæfell (north of Vatnajökull).

The volcanic system consists of the Snaehetta central volcano with a large caldera. Most of the volcano, including the 40 km2 caldera, is covered by the icecap. On the other hand are parts of the SE flank exposed in NW-SE-trending ridges. Most of the exposed rocks are mildly alkaline basalts, but one may also find small amounts of rhyolitic rocks.

In the beginning of September 1927, a jökulhlaup came down the Jökulsá á Breiðamerkursandi. The glacier run was accompanied by a sulfur stench. On one occasion, ash fall on the Breiðamerkurjökull was thought to have possibly originated from Esjufjöll. Although Holocene eruptions have not been confirmed from Esjufjöll, earthquake swarms that could indicate magma movements were detected in October 2002, and recently in October 2010.

Mountaineering
Ari Trausti Guðmundsson proposes a mountaineering tour crossing Breiðamerkurjökull and up on Lyngbrekkutindur.

See also
List of volcanoes in Iceland

References

External links 

 Esjufjöll in the Catalogue of Icelandic Volcanoes

Stratovolcanoes of Iceland
Active volcanoes
Öræfajökull Belt
Subglacial volcanoes of Iceland
Volcanic systems of Iceland
Calderas of Iceland